The year 1971 in film involved some significant events.

Highest-grossing films (U.S.)

The top ten 1971 released films by box office gross in North America are as follows:

Events
February 8 - Bob Dylan's hour-long documentary film, Eat the Document, premieres at New York's Academy of Music. The film includes footage from Dylan's 1966 UK tour.
April 23 - Melvin Van Peebles film Sweet Sweetback's Baadasssss Song becomes the highest-grossing independent film of 1971.
May - The first permanent IMAX projection system begins showing at Ontario Place's "Cinesphere" in Toronto.
May 10 - Frank Yablans becomes President of Paramount Pictures.
Britain's National Film School begins operation at Beaconsfield Film Studios.

Awards 

Palme d'Or (Cannes Film Festival):
The Go-Between, directed by Joseph Losey, United Kingdom

Golden Bear (Berlin Film Festival):
The Garden of the Finzi-Continis (Il Giardino dei Finzi-Contini), directed by Vittorio De Sica, Italy / W. Germany

1971 Wide-release movies
United States unless stated

January–March

April–June

July–September

October–December

Notable films released in 1971
United States unless stated

#
$ (a.k.a. Dollars, The Heist), starring Warren Beatty and Goldie Hawn
10 Rillington Place, starring Richard Attenborough and John Hurt - (U.K.)
1870, Italian historical drama starring Anna Magnani and Marcello Mastroianni
200 Motels, featuring Frank Zappa and The Mothers of Invention
The 300 Year Weekend, starring Michael Tolan and William Devane

A
Aabhijathyam, Indian Malayalam, directed by A Vincent and produced by RS Prabhu, with stars Madhu, Sharada and Sukumari
Aana Valarthiya Vanampadiyude Makan, Indian Malayalam, directed and produced by P. Subramaniam, with stars Gemini Ganesan and Rajasree
Aap Aye Bahaar Ayee, Bollywood film produced, directed and written by Mohan Kumar, with stars Rajendra Kumar and Sadhana
The Abominable Dr. Phibes, starring Vincent Price and Joseph Cotten - (U.K.)
Achante Bharya, Indian Malayalam-language film, directed by Thikkurissy Sukumaran Nair, with stars Adoor Bhasi, K. P. Ummer and Ragini
Adrift on the Nile (Thartharah fawq al-Nil), directed by Hussein Kamal - (Egypt)
Adiós, Sabata (a.k.a. The Bounty Hunters), starring Yul Brynner - (Italy)
The Adversary (Pratidwandi), directed by Satyajit Ray - (India)
Agnimrigam, Indian Malayalam-language film, directed by M. Krishnan Nair, with stars Prem Nazir, Sathyan and Sheela
Amar Prem (Immortal Love), starring Sharmila Tagore and Rajesh Khanna - (India)
Anand, starring Rajesh Khanna - (India)
The Anderson Tapes, directed by Sidney Lumet, starring Sean Connery, Dyan Cannon, Martin Balsam, Christopher Walken
And Now for Something Completely Different, a Monty Python film - (U.K.)
The Andromeda Strain, directed by Robert Wise, starring Arthur Hill, Kate Reid, David Wayne, James Olson
Animal Treasure Island (Dōbutsu Takarajima) - (Japan)

B
Bananas, directed by and starring Woody Allen, with Louise Lasser and Howard Cosell
The Barefoot Executive, starring Kurt Russell
The Battle of Kerzhenets (Secha pri Kerzhentse) - (U.S.S.R.)
Bedknobs and Broomsticks, starring Angela Lansbury and David Tomlinson
The Beguiled, starring Clint Eastwood and Geraldine Page
Benny's Bathtub (Bennys badekar) - (Denmark)
Between Miracles (Per grazia ricevuta), directed by and starring Nino Manfredi - (Italy)
Beware of a Holy Whore (Warnung vor einer heiligen Nutte), directed by Rainer Werner Fassbinder - (West Germany)
The Big Boss (Tang shan da xiong / a.k.a. Fists of Fury), starring Bruce Lee - (Hong Kong)
The Big Doll House, starring Pam Grier
Big Jake, starring John Wayne, Richard Boone, Maureen O'Hara
Billy Jack, starring Tom Laughlin, re-released in 1973
Bleak Moments, directed by Mike Leigh, starring Anne Raitt, Sarah Stephenson - (U.K.)
Bless the Beasts and Children, directed by Stanley Kramer, starring Bill Mumy
The Blood on Satan's Claw, starring Patrick Wymark and Linda Hayden- (U.K.)
The Boat on the Grass (Le Bateau sur l'herbe), starring Jean-Pierre Cassel - (France)
Born to Win, starring George Segal, Paula Prentiss, Héctor Elizondo, Karen Black, Robert De Niro
The Boy Friend, directed by Ken Russell, starring Twiggy - (U.K.)
Brian's Song, starring James Caan, Billy Dee Williams, Shelley Fabares, Judy Pace, Jack Warden
Brother John, starring Sidney Poitier
Bunny O'Hare, starring Bette Davis

C
Carnal Knowledge, directed by Mike Nichols, starring Jack Nicholson, Art Garfunkel, Ann-Margret, Candice Bergen
Carry On Henry, directed by Gerald Thomas, starring Sid James, Kenneth Williams, Joan Sims - (U.K.)
The Ceremony (Gashiki), directed by Nagisa Oshima - (Japan)
Chandler, starring Warren Oates and Leslie Caron
Le Chat (The Cat), directed by Pierre Granier-Deferre, starring Jean Gabin and Simone Signoret - (France)
A Clockwork Orange, directed by Stanley Kubrick, starring Malcolm McDowell - (U.K.)
The Clowns (I clowns), a TV film directed by and starring Federico Fellini - (Italy)
Cold Turkey, directed by Norman Lear, starring Dick Van Dyke and Bob Newhart
Confessions of a Police Captain (Confessione di un commissario di polizia al procuratore della repubblica), starring Franco Nero - (Italy)
Countess Dracula, starring Ingrid Pitt - (U.K.)
Crucible of Terror, starring Mike Raven, James Bolam and Mary Maude- (U.K.)

D
Daughters of Darkness, directed by Harry Kümel, starring Delphine Seyrig - (Belgium)
Dauria - (U.S.S.R.)
The Deadly Duo (Shuang xia), directed by Chang Cheh - (Hong Kong)
The Deadly Trap, starring Faye Dunaway and Frank Langella
Death in Venice (Morte a Venezia), directed by Luchino Visconti, starring Dirk Bogarde and Silvana Mangano - (Italy/France)
The Decameron, directed by Pier Paolo Pasolini - (Italy)
The Deserter, directed by Burt Kennedy, starring Bekim Fehmiu, John Huston, Richard Crenna, Chuck Connors, Brandon deWilde
Desperate Characters, directed by Frank D. Gilroy, starring Shirley MacLaine and Kenneth Mars
The Devils, directed by Ken Russell, starring Oliver Reed and Vanessa Redgrave - (U.K.)
The Devil Has Seven Faces, starring Stephen Boyd and Carroll Baker- (Italy)
Die Screaming, Marianne, starring Susan George and Barry Evans- (U.K.)
Diamonds Are Forever, starring Sean Connery (as James Bond), with Jill St. John, Jimmy Dean, Charles Gray - (U.K.)
Dirty Harry, directed by Don Siegel, starring Clint Eastwood, Andy Robinson, John Vernon, Reni Santoni
Doc, starring Stacy Keach and Faye Dunaway
Drive, He Said, directed by Jack Nicholson, starring Karen Black and Bruce Dern
Duel, the directorial debut of Steven Spielberg, starring Dennis Weaver
Dulcima, starring John Mills and Carol White - (U.K.)

E
The Emigrants, directed by Jan Troell, starring Max von Sydow and Liv Ullmann - (Sweden)
Escape from the Planet of the Apes, starring Roddy McDowall, Kim Hunter, Bradford Dillman, Natalie Trundy, Ricardo Montalbán, Eric Braeden, William Windom, Sal Mineo
Evdokia, directed by Alexis Damianos - (Greece)
Evel Knievel, starring George Hamilton and Sue Lyon

F
Family Life (Życie rodzinne) - (Poland)
Family Life, directed by Ken Loach - (U.K.)
Fiddler on the Roof, directed by Norman Jewison, starring Chaim Topol
A Fistful of Dynamite (a.k.a. Duck You Sucker), directed by Sergio Leone, starring James Coburn and Rod Steiger - (Italy)
Fleeing the Trap, starring Behrouz Vossoughi and Davoud Rashidi (Iran)
Fools' Parade, starring James Stewart, George Kennedy, Kurt Russell
Fortune and Men's Eyes - (Canada)
Four Nights of a Dreamer (Quatre nuits d'un rêveur), directed by Robert Bresson - (France)
The French Connection, directed by William Friedkin, starring Gene Hackman, Fernando Rey, Roy Scheider - 5 Academy Awards including best film, director and actor
Fright, starring Susan George and Honor Blackman - (U.K.)
Fun and Games, British exploitation film directed by Ray Austin

G
The Gang That Couldn't Shoot Straight, starring Jerry Orbach, Leigh Taylor-Young, Robert De Niro
Gas-s-s-s, directed by Roger Corman
Gentlemen of Fortune (Dzhentlmeny udachi) - (U.S.S.R.)
Get Carter, directed by Mike Hodges, starring Michael Caine - (U.K.)
A Girl in Australia (Bello onesto emigrato Australia), starring Alberto Sordi - (Italy/Australia)
The Go-Between, directed by Joseph Losey, starring Julie Christie, Alan Bates, Dominic Guard - (U.K.)
Godzilla vs. Hedorah (Godzilla vs. the Smog Monster) - (Japan)
Grandads-Robbers (Stariki-razboyniki) - (U.S.S.R.)
The Grissom Gang, starring Kim Darby and Scott Wilson
Guddi, starring Dharmendra - (India)
Gumshoe, directed by Stephen Frears, starring Albert Finney and Billie Whitelaw - (U.K.)
A Gunfight, starring Kirk Douglas and Johnny Cash

H
Hannie Caulder, starring Raquel Welch, Ernest Borgnine, Robert Culp
Hare Rama Hare Krishna, directed by and starring Dev Anand - (India)
Harold and Maude, directed by Hal Ashby, starring Ruth Gordon and Bud Cort
The Hellstrom Chronicle, a documentary directed by Walon Green narrated by a dramatized title character portrayed by Lawrence Pressman
The Hired Hand, directed by and starring Peter Fonda, with Warren Oates, Verna Bloom
The Horsemen, directed by John Frankenheimer, starring Omar Sharif and Jack Palance
The Hospital, directed by Arthur Hiller, starring George C. Scott and Diana Rigg
How Tasty Was My Little Frenchman (Como Era Gostoso o Meu Francês) - (Brazil)
How to Frame a Figg, starring Don Knotts and Yvonne Craig
The Hunting Party, starring Gene Hackman, Candice Bergen, Oliver Reed

I
I, Monster, starring Christopher Lee and Peter Cushing - (U.K.)
In Prison Awaiting Trial (Detenuto in attesa di giudizio), starring Alberto Sordi - (Italy)

J
Joe Hill, directed by Bo Widerberg - (Sweden/United States)
Johnny Got His Gun, directed by Dalton Trumbo, starring Timothy Bottoms, Diane Varsi, Jason Robards, Donald Sutherland
Juste avant la nuit (a.k.a. Just Before Nightfall), directed by Claude Chabrol, starring Stéphane Audran - (France)
Jwala (Fire), directed by M. V. Raman and starring Madhubala in her last film appearance - (India)

K
King Lear, directed by Peter Brook, starring Paul Scofield - (U.K.)
King Lear, directed by Grigori Kozintsev - (U.S.S.R.)
Klute, directed by Alan J. Pakula, starring Jane Fonda (Oscar winner), Donald Sutherland, Charles Cioffi, Roy Scheider
Kotch, directed by Jack Lemmon, starring Walter Matthau

L
Land of Silence and Darkness (Land des Schweigens und der Dunkelheit), directed by Werner Herzog - (West Germany)
The Last Picture Show, directed by Peter Bogdanovich, starring Timothy Bottoms, Jeff Bridges, Cybill Shepherd, Cloris Leachman, Ellen Burstyn, Ben Johnson
The Last Run, starring George C. Scott
Lawman, starring Burt Lancaster, Lee J. Cobb, Robert Ryan, Robert Duvall
Le Mans, starring Steve McQueen
Liberation (Osvobozhdenie / Befreiung), directed by Yuri Ozerov - (U.S.S.R./East Germany/Poland/Yugoslavia/Italy)
The Light at the Edge of the World
Little Murders, directed by Alan Arkin, starring Elliott Gould, Marcia Rodd, Vincent Gardenia, Elizabeth Wilson, Donald Sutherland
Love (Szerelem) - (Hungary)
The Love Machine, directed by Jack Haley, Jr., starring Dyan Cannon

M
Macbeth, directed by Roman Polanski, starring Jon Finch and Francesca Annis - (U.K./U.S.)
Made for Each Other, starring Joseph Bologna and Renée Taylor
Malpertuis, starring Orson Welles and Susan Hampshire - (Belgium/France)
Man in the Wilderness, starring Richard Harris
The Marriage of a Young Stockbroker, starring Richard Benjamin, Joanna Shimkus and Adam West
Mary, Queen of Scots, starring Vanessa Redgrave and Glenda Jackson - (U.K.)
McCabe & Mrs. Miller, directed by Robert Altman, starring Warren Beatty and Julie Christie
Melody, starring Mark Lester and Jack Wild - (U.K.)
The Mephisto Waltz, starring Alan Alda and Jacqueline Bisset
Mere Apne - (India)
The Million Dollar Duck, starring Sandy Duncan
Minnie and Moskowitz, directed by John Cassavetes, starring Gena Rowlands and Seymour Cassel
Mira, directed by Fons Rademakers - (Netherlands/Belgium)
The Missing Clerk (Den forsvundne fuldmægtig) - (Denmark)
Mon oncle Antoine - considered by some critics the greatest Canadian film - (Canada)
Murmur of the Heart, directed by Louis Malle - (France/Italy/West Germany)
Murphy's War, starring Peter O'Toole

N
A New Leaf, directed by and starring Elaine May, co-starring Walter Matthau
Nicholas and Alexandra, directed by Franklin J. Schaffner, starring Michael Jayston, Janet Suzman, Laurence Olivier, Jack Hawkins - (U.K.)
Night of Dark Shadows, directed by Dan Curtis, starring David Selby and Grayson Hall
The Night Digger (a.k.a. The Road Builder), starring Patricia Neal - (U.K.)
The Night God Screamed, low-budget psychological horror starring Jeanne Crain with Alex Nicol, Gary Morgan, James Sikking
 Nikah Halala, by Nosrat Karimi (Iran)

O
Octaman  
Officers (ofitsery) - (U.S.S.R.)
Oil Lamps (Petrolejové lampy) - (Czechoslovakia)
The Omega Man, starring Charlton Heston and Anthony Zerbe
On the Buses, starring Reg Varney - (U.K.)
One Armed Boxer (Du bei chuan wang), starring Jimmy Wang Yu - (Hong Kong)
One More Train to Rob, starring George Peppard and Diana Muldaur
Out 1 (a.k.a. Out 1, noli me tangere), directed by Jacques Rivette, starring Jean-Pierre Léaud - (France)

P
The Panic in Needle Park, starring Al Pacino
The Pine Tree in the Mountain (U gori raste zelen bor) - (Yugoslavia)
Play Misty for Me, directed by and starring Clint Eastwood, with Jessica Walter and Donna Mills
Plaza Suite, directed by Arthur Hiller, starring Walter Matthau, Maureen Stapleton, Barbara Harris, Lee Grant
Please Sir! (film), starring John Alderton, Peter Cleall, Carol Hawkins, Joan Sanderson
Porcupines Are Born Without Bristles (Taralezhite se razhdat bez bodli) - (Bulgaria)
Pretty Maids All in a Row, written and produced by Gene Roddenberry, directed by Roger Vadim, starring Rock Hudson and Angie Dickinson
Punishment Park, directed by Peter Watkins
The Pursuit of Happiness, starring Michael Sarrazin, Barbara Hershey, Robert Klein

R
Raid on Rommel, directed by Henry Hathaway, starring Richard Burton and John Colicos
Raphael, or The Debauched One (Raphaël ou le Débauché) - (France)
Red Sky at Morning, starring Richard Thomas and Desi Arnaz, Jr.
Red Sun, starring Charles Bronson, Ursula Andress, Toshiro Mifune, Alain Delon - (France/Italy/Spain)
Rendezvous at Bray, starring Anna Karina - (France/Belgium)

S
Sacco e Vanzetti, starring Gian Maria Volonté - (Italy)
A Safe Place, starring Jack Nicholson and Tuesday Weld
The Salamander (La Salamandre), starring Bulle Ogier - (Switzerland)
See No Evil, starring Mia Farrow
The Seven Minutes, starring Marianne McAndrew
Shaft, directed by Gordon Parks, starring Richard Roundtree
She Killed in Ecstasy (Sie tötete in Ekstase) - (West Germany/Spain)
Shoot Out, directed by Henry Hathaway, starring Gregory Peck
Silence (Chinmoku) - (Japan)
Skin Game, starring James Garner and Louis Gossett Jr.
Something Big, starring Dean Martin
Sometimes a Great Notion (Never Give an Inch), directed by and starring Paul Newman, with Henry Fonda, Lee Remick, Richard Jaeckel, Michael Sarrazin
Soul to Soul, a concert documentary featuring Wilson Pickett, Ike & Tina Turner and more
Star Spangled Girl, directed by Jerry Paris, starring Sandy Duncan and Tony Roberts
Straw Dogs, directed by Sam Peckinpah, starring Dustin Hoffman and Susan George - (U.K./U.S.)
Such Good Friends, directed by Otto Preminger, starring Dyan Cannon and Burgess Meredith
Summer of '42, directed by Robert Mulligan, starring Jennifer O'Neill and Gary Grimes
Sunday, Bloody Sunday, directed by John Schlesinger, starring Peter Finch and Glenda Jackson - (U.K.)
Support Your Local Gunfighter, starring James Garner and Suzanne Pleshette
Sweet Sweetback's Baadasssss Song, directed by Melvin Van Peebles
Sympathy for the Underdog (Bakuto gaijin butai) - (Japan)

T
The Ski Bum, starring Charlotte Rampling
THX 1138, the directorial debut of George Lucas, starring Robert Duvall
T.R. Baskin, starring Candice Bergen
Taking Off, directed by Miloš Forman, starring Lynn Carlin and Buck Henry
The Killers, directed by Ashraf Fahmy, starring Salah Zulfikar and Nahed Sherif - (Egypt)
The Tales of Beatrix Potter, a dance film featuring The Royal Ballet - (U.K.)
They Might Be Giants, starring George C. Scott and Joanne Woodward
Three Reservists (Trimata ot zapasa), directed by Zako Heskiya, starring Georgi Partsalev and Kiril Gospodinov - (Bulgaria)
A Touch of Zen (Xia nu) - (Taiwan)
Trafic, directed by and starring Jacques Tati - (France)
The Trojan Women, directed by Michael Cacoyannis, starring Katharine Hepburn, Vanessa Redgrave, Irene Papas - (US/UK/Greece)
Twitch of the Death Nerve (Ecologia del delitto), starring Claudine Auger - (Italy)
Two English Girls (Les deux anglaises et le continent), directed by François Truffaut, starring Jean-Pierre Léaud - (France)
Two-Lane Blacktop, starring James Taylor and Warren Oates

U
Unman, Wittering and Zigo, starring David Hemmings - (U.K.)
Up Pompeii, starring Frankie Howerd and Michael Hordern - (U.K.)

V
Valdez Is Coming, starring Burt Lancaster, Susan Clark, Jon Cypher, Richard Jordan
Vampyros Lesbos, directed by Jesus Franco
Vanishing Point, starring Barry Newman and Cleavon Little
Villain, starring Richard Burton and Ian McShane - (U.K.)
Von Richthofen and Brown (a.k.a. The Red Baron), directed by Roger Corman, starring John Phillip Law

W
W.R.: Mysteries of the Organism (W.R. - Misterije organizma) - (Yugoslavia/West Germany)
Wake in Fright, directed by Ted Kotcheff, starring Donald Pleasence - (Australia)
Walkabout, directed by Nicolas Roeg, starring Jenny Agutter and David Gulpilil - (Australia/U.K.)
Le Wazzou polygame (The Polygamist's Morale) - (Niger/France)
What's the Matter with Helen?, starring Debbie Reynolds and Shelley Winters
What the Peeper Saw, starring  Britt Ekland, Mark Lester, Hardy Krüger
When Eight Bells Toll, starring Anthony Hopkins, Robert Morley, Nathalie Delon, Jack Hawkins - (U.K.)
Whity, directed by Rainer Werner Fassbinder - (West Germany)
Whoever Slew Auntie Roo?, starring Shelley Winters and Mark Lester
Who Is Harry Kellerman and Why Is He Saying Those Terrible Things About Me?, starring Dustin Hoffman
Who Killed Mary What's 'Er Name? a.k.a. Death of a Hooker, starring Red Buttons and Sylvia Miles
Wild Rovers, directed by Blake Edwards, starring William Holden and Ryan O'Neal
Willard, starring Bruce Davison, Elsa Lanchester, Ernest Borgnine
Willy Wonka & the Chocolate Factory, directed by Mel Stuart, starring Gene Wilder and Jack Albertson
Witch, directed by Henry Barakat, starring Salah Zulfikar and Faten Hamama, short film – (Egypt)
The Working Class Goes to Heaven (La classe operaia va in paradiso), starring Gian Maria Volonté, Palme d'Or winner - (Italy)

Y
You Are a Widow, Sir (Pane, vy jste vdova!) - (Czechoslovakia)
The Young Graduates, directed by Robert Anderson, starring Patrick Wymer, Steven Stewart, Gary Rist and Bruno Kirby

Z
Zeppelin, starring Elke Sommer and Michael York - (U.K.)

Short film series
 The Pink Panther (1964–69)(1971-72)(1974–77)(1978–80)
 The Ant and the Aardvark (1969–1971)
 Roland and Rattfink (1968–1971)
 Tijuana Toads (1969–72)
 Woody Woodpecker (1941–49, 1951–72)
 Chilly Willy (1953–72)
 The Beary Family (1962–72)

Births
January 2
Taye Diggs, American actor
Renée Elise Goldsberry, American actress and singer
January 7 - Jeremy Renner, American actor
January 11 - Mary J. Blige, American singer-songwriter and actress
January 15 - Regina King, American actress
January 17 - Youki Kudoh, Japanese actress and singer
January 19 - Shawn Wayans, American actor, comedian, writer and producer
January 21 - Dylan Kussman, American writer and actor
January 23 - Diana Barrows, American actor, singer and dancer
January 24 - Stanislas Merhar, French actor 
January 27
Karin Tammaru, Estonian actress
Fann Wong, Singaporean actress, singer and model
January 31 - Darren Boyd, British actor
February 1 
Michael C. Hall, American actor
Jill Kelly, American pornographic actress
Hynden Walch, American actress, voice actress, writer and singer
February 3 - Elisa Donovan, American actress
February 4 - Rob Corddry, American actor and comedian
February 6 - Brian Stepanek, American actor
February 11 - Damian Lewis, English actor
February 12 - Scott Menville, American actor
February 14 - Noriko Sakai, Japanese actress and singer
February 15 
Alex Borstein, American actress
Renee O'Connor, American actress 
February 17 - Denise Richards, American actress
February 18 - Hiep Thi Le, Vietnamese-American actress (d. 2017)
February 21 - Andréa Burns, American actress and singer
February 22 - Lea Salonga, Filipina actress, singer, and columnist
February 25 - Sean Astin, American actor
March 1
Ma Dong-seok, South Korean-born American actor
Teresa Gallagher, American-born British actress, voice actress and singer
March 2 - Method Man, American actor and musician
March 4 - Shavar Ross, American actor, director, screenwriter, producer and editor
March 5
Yuri Lowenthal, American voice actor
Scott Mosier, American producer, director and editor
March 7
Peter Sarsgaard, American actor
Matthew Vaughn, English filmmaker
March 10 - Jon Hamm, American actor
March 11 - Johnny Knoxville, American actor, comedian, producer, and screenwriter
March 13 - Annabeth Gish, American actress
March 15 - Chris Patton, American voice actor
March 16 - Alan Tudyk, American actor and voice actor
March 22
Keegan-Michael Key, American actor, comedian, writer and producer
Will Yun Lee, American actor and martial artist
March 25 - Peter Shinkoda, Canadian actor
March 26 - Francis Lawrence, Austrian-born American filmmaker and producer
March 27 - Nathan Fillion, Canadian actor
March 29 - Michael-Leon Wooley, American theatre, film, television and voice actor
March 31 - Ewan McGregor, Scottish actor
April 5 - Krista Allen, American actress, model and stand-up comedian
April 7 - Jennifer Schwalbach Smith, American actress
April 12 - Shannen Doherty, American actress
April 15
Andy Daly, American actor, comedian and writer
Kate Harbour, English voice actress
April 16 - Peter Billingsley, American actor, director and producer
April 18 - David Tennant, Scottish actor
April 19
Gad Elmaleh, Moroccan-Canadian stand-up comedian and actor
Wendy Powell, American voice actress
April 28 - Bridget Moynahan, American actress
May 10 - Adriano Giannini, Italian actor and voice actor
May 14 - Sofia Coppola, American actress, writer, and director
May 22 - MC Eiht, American rapper and actor
May 25 - Justin Henry, American actor
May 26 - Matt Stone, American actor, creator of South Park
May 27 
Paul Bettany, English actor
Lisa Lopes, American singer and actress (d. 2002)
May 30
Duncan Jones, British director, producer and screenwriter
Idina Menzel, American actress, singer and songwriter
June 4
James Callis, British actor
Noah Wyle, American actor
June 5 - Mark Wahlberg, American actor and musician
June 11 - Kenjiro Tsuda, Japanese actor
June 12 - Joe Wright, British director
June 15 
Jake Busey, American actor
Taavi Eelmaa, Estonian actor
June 16 
Eva Püssa, Estonian actress 
Tupac Shakur, American actor and rapper (d. 1996)
June 18 - Lisa Barbuscia, American model, singer and actress
June 20 - Josh Lucas, American actor
June 28 - Aileen Quinn, American actress and singer
June 30 - Monica Potter, American actress
July 1 - Missy Elliott, American musician and actress
July 7 - Christian Camargo, American actor, producer, writer and director
July 8 - Amanda Peterson, American actress (d. 2015)
July 15 - Jim Rash, American actor, comedian and filmmaker
July 16 - Corey Feldman, American actor
July 18 - Sarah McLeod, New Zealand actress
July 19 - Andres Puustusmaa, Estonian actor and director
July 20 - Sandra Oh, Canadian-American actress
July 21 - Charlotte Gainsbourg, French actress
July 24 - Patty Jenkins, American director, screenwriter and producer
July 30 - Christine Taylor, American actress
July 31 - Eve Best, British actress
August 4 - Yo-Yo (rapper), American rapper and actress
August 10 - Justin Theroux, American actor
August 12
Rebecca Gayheart, American actress
Yvette Nicole Brown, American actress, comedian, writer and host
August 13 - Heike Makatsch, German actress, voice actress and singer
August 18 - Jacob Vargas, Mexican-American actor
August 20 
David Walliams, English comedian, actor, writer and television personality
Ke Huy Quan, American actor and stunt choreographer
August 21 - Kristi Angus, Canadian actress
August 22 - Richard Armitage (actor), English actor
August 25 - Claire Rushbrook, English actress
August 29 - Carla Gugino, American actress
August 31 - Chris Tucker, American actor
September 3 - Drena De Niro, American actress and filmmaker
September 8
David Arquette, American actor, film director, producer and screenwriter
Martin Freeman, English actor
September 9
Eric Stonestreet, American actor and comedian
Henry Thomas, American actor
September 14 - Kimberly Williams-Paisley, American actress
September 15
Josh Charles, American actor
Colleen O'Shaughnessey, American voice actress
September 16 - Amy Poehler, American actress
September 17
Felix Solis, American actor, director and producer
Ian Whyte (actor), Welsh actor and stuntman
September 18 - Jada Pinkett Smith, American actress
September 19 - Selene Luna, Mexican-American actress and comedian
September 21 - Luke Wilson, American actor
September 27 - Amanda Detmer, American actress
September 29 - Mackenzie Crook, English actor, comedian, director and writer
September 30 - Jenna Elfman, American actress
October 5 – Samuel Vincent, Canadian voice actor and singer
October 6 - Emily Mortimer, English actress
October 11
Justin Lin, Taiwanese-American director
Trish Sie, American director
October 13 - Sacha Baron Cohen, English actor, comedian, screenwriter and producer
October 17 - Andy Whitfield, Welsh actor (d. 2011)
October 20
Snoop Dogg, American rapper, songwriter, media personality and actor
Rachel House (actress), New Zealand actress and director
October 21 - Jennifer Lee (filmmaker), American screenwriter, film director and chief creative officer of Walt Disney Animation Studios
October 25 - Craig Robinson, American actor, comedian, musician and singer
October 26
Rosemarie DeWitt, American actress
Anthony Rapp, American actor and singer
Phil Johnston (filmmaker), American screenwriter, director, producer and voice actor
October 29 - Winona Ryder, American actress
November 2 - Meta Golding, Haitian-American actress
November 3
Piret Laurimaa, Estonian actress
Dylan Moran, Irish comedian, writer and actor
November 4 - Tabu, Indian actress
November 9 - Jason Antoon, American actor
November 10 - Walton Goggins, American actor
November 13 - Noah Hathaway, American actor
November 14 - Marco Leonardi, Italian actor
November 16 - Justine Clarke, Australian actress, singer, musician and television host
November 17 - David Ramsey, American actor, director and martial artist
November 18 - Goran Kostić, Serbian actor
November 20 - Joel McHale, American actor, comedian, writer, producer and television host
November 23
Lisa Arch, American actress and comedian
Chris Hardwick, American comedian, actor, television and podcast host, writer and producer
November 25 - Christina Applegate, American actress
December 3 - Ola Rapace, Swedish actor
December 5
Kali Rocha, American actress
Dolly Wells, English actress and writer
December 6 - Katariina Unt, Estonian actress
December 7 - DeObia Oparei, English actor
December 9 - Emma Thomas, English producer
December 14 - Natascha McElhone, British actress
December 17
Sinan Akkuş, Turkish-German actor
Claire Forlani, English actress
December 18 - Claudia Gerini, Italian actress
December 23 - Corey Haim, Canadian actor (d. 2010)
December 25
Patrick Baladi, English actor and musician
Ain Mäeots, Estonian actor, director and producer
December 26 - Jared Leto, American actor and musician

Deaths

Film debuts 
F. Murray Abraham - They Might Be Giants
Brooke Adams - Murders in the Rue Morgue
John Amos - Vanishing Point
Alun Armstrong - Get Carter
Kathy Bates - Taking Off
Timothy Bottoms - Johnny Got His Gun
Jim Broadbent - The Go-Between
Keith Carradine - McCabe & Mrs. Miller
Stockard Channing - The Hospital
Dennis Christopher - Blood and Lace
Brian Cox - Nicholas and Alexandra
Wes Craven - You've Got to Walk It Like You Talk It or You'll Lose That Beat (editor)
Daniel Day-Lewis - Sunday Bloody Sunday
Gérard Depardieu - Cry of the Cormoran
Larry Drake - This Stuff'll Kill Ya!
Georgia Engel - Taking Off
Christopher Guest - The Hospital
Edward Herrmann - Lady Liberty
Judd Hirsch - Jump
Eric Idle - And Now for Something Completely Different
Carol Kane - Carnal Knowledge
William Katt - The Late Liz
Kris Kristofferson - The Last Movie
Eugene Levy - Foxy Lady
Andrea Martin - Foxy Lady
Craig T. Nelson - The Return of Count Yorga
Cassandra Peterson - Diamonds Are Forever
Randy Quaid - The Last Picture Show
John Ritter - The Barefoot Executive
Wayne Robson - McCabe & Mrs. Miller
Vincent Schiavelli – Taking Off
Cybill Shepherd - The Last Picture Show
Josef Sommer - Dirty Harry
Bruce Spence - Stork
David Ogden Stiers - THX 1138
Glynn Turman - Honky
Susan Tyrrell - Shoot Out
Mario Van Peebles - Sweet Sweetback's Baadasssss Song
Tracey Walter - Ginger
Jacki Weaver - Stork
Noble Willingham - The Last Picture Show

References

 
Film by year